This is a list of lighthouses in Tanzania.

Lighthouses

See also
List of lighthouses in Kenya (to the north)
List of lighthouses in South Africa (to the south-east)
 Lists of lighthouses and lightvessels

References

External links
 

 
Lists of lighthouses
Lighthouse
Lighthouses